The apolipoprotein B (apoB) 5′ UTR cis regulatory element is an RNA element located in the 5′ UTR of the human apoB mRNA. This structured element increases translation of the apoB protein or a reporter gene.

References

External links 
 

Cis-regulatory RNA elements